Joti Samra is a Canadian television personality who is co-host and finance expert on the docu-reality television series Million Dollar Neighbourhood on the Oprah Winfrey Network airing in Canada and the US. Samra was born in a suburb of Vancouver, British Columbia, Canada. She holds a bachelor's degree in psychology from the University of British Columbia, master's degree in clinical psychology from the University of Regina and a PhD in clinical-forensic psychology from Simon Fraser University. Samra was the psychological consultant to Citytv's The Bachelor Canada and was a featured clinical expert in all three seasons of the Animal Planet docu-reality series Confessions: Animal Hoarding, developed by the producers of the critically acclaimed A&E series Intervention. She has authored a weekly "Ask the Health Expert" column for The Globe and Mail since 2010. In April 2016 Dr. Samra started a weekly radio program on the Surrey BC station 107.7 Pulse FM. (pulsefm.ca)

References

External links
 Joti Samra's television career at IMDb

 
 

Living people
People from Vancouver
Canadian television personalities
Year of birth missing (living people)